The Haas Building is located at 219 West 7th Street, at the corner of Broadway and Seventh Street, in Historic Downtown Los Angeles, California. The building was originally owned by Abraham Haas of San Francisco; president of Haas, Baruch, CXL & PWL'S. The structure was made to be one of the finest and most modern buildings of the time. The building was constructed in the year 1915, built with the latest steel frame and absolutely fireproof. The Haas Building was completed early 1915.

The interior woodwork was made in solid mahogany; the corridors were floored with marble with seven-foot marble wainscoting. The floor, walls and ceiling of the lobby were also made with marble. Including the three high-speed elevators that were installed, fixtures and interiors were said to have cost approximately $100,000.

The building had been given a complete makeover in the 1970s, with the classic exterior lost to brown metal panels. While much of the exterior brick and detail work was removed, the pieces around the entryway survived, though they were heavily damaged.

Tenants

During December 1915, the Bank of Italy secured a 25-year lease on the ground floor and the basement of the building. J.H. Skinner, Vice-President, arranged the movement of location and left San Francisco the next day to report the situation to the directorate.  of space was allocated on the ground floor of the building. Safe deposit and coin vaults were kept in the basement, while further space could be secured by the construction of the mezzanine floor.
W J Pearson & Co. occupied a large part of the 3rd floor of Haas Building. It was an excellent place to diagnose financial conditions in and around Los Angeles because of the great number of meetings there between buyers and sellers of realty, leaser and lessees.

The other 11 stories consisted of 225 offices, each with direct and alternating current attachments- compressed air, gas, water and extra sewer outlet.

Other Major occupants of The Haas Building:
 Southern California Tourist Bureau
 Lee H. Stodder Company – exclusive selling agent for Burkhard Investment Company
 Southern California Oil Co.
 Chicago Tribune - Opened a branch office, hoping to attract California advertisers to the midwestern paper.

Current

The Haas Building has undergone a complete remodel and will have 68 live/work lofts for lease.  In addition the top two floors of The Haas Building will be the home of LoftSeven, a multi-functional private event space. The  space has the feel of a modern boutique hotel with touches of its illustrious 99-year history throughout. LoftSeven is scheduled to launch in 2009.

References

Office buildings in Los Angeles
Buildings and structures in Downtown Los Angeles
Residential buildings in Los Angeles
Skyscrapers in Los Angeles
Office buildings completed in 1915
1915 establishments in California
1910s architecture in the United States
Morgan, Walls & Clements buildings